Velká Chmelištná is a municipality and village in Rakovník District in the Central Bohemian Region of the Czech Republic. It has about 60 inhabitants.

Administrative parts
The village of Hůrky is an administrative part of Velká Chmelištná.

References

Villages in Rakovník District